Vernon Linwood Howard (March 16, 1918 – August 23, 1992) was an American spiritual teacher, author, and philosopher.

Career as writer and teacher 

Howard was born near Haverhill, Massachusetts, and began his writing career in the 1940s as an author of humor and children's books. He began speaking on the principles of personal development in the late 1950s while living in southern California. In the 1960s, he began writing books that focused on spiritual and psychological growth. These writings emphasized the importance and practice of self-awareness. By the early 1970s, he had moved to Boulder City, Nevada, and had begun teaching spiritual development classes after being contacted by numerous individuals interested in his writings.

Philosophy and teachings 
Howard drew from what he perceived as being a "common thread" among several different philosophical and spiritual traditions for his insights and teachings. These included: Christian and Eastern mysticism, Gurdjieffian Fourth Way teachings, the Gospels of the New Testament, Jungian psychology, J. Krishnamurti and American Transcendentalism. He taught that there is a way out of suffering, and advocated self-honesty, persistence, the study and application of spiritual principles, and a sincere desire for inner change, according to Psycho-Pictography (page 34). He explained that a new and higher inner life is found through releasing the negative conditioned ego, which he described as the "false self". He asserted that this new life can only be found through awareness, and that the human ego is a barrier to this awareness. Thus, he taught that inner liberation is a ridding process, and that the false self is a fictitious collection of self-images or pictures about who we think we are (Psycho-Pictography, page 33).

Legacy 

In 1979, Howard founded the non-profit learning center New Life Foundation, where he continued to teach until his death in 1992. The foundation, now located in Pine, Arizona, continues Howard's legacy via personal classes held by some of the students who studied with Howard, as well as the marketing of his writings and recorded talks.

After Howard's death, several non-profit Foundations were established as a result of his many years of teaching. Mark L Butler, who studied with Howard from 1972 until 1992, established the Eagle Literary Foundation in Eagle, Idaho, in 1994. Guy Finley, who studied with him from 1978 until 1992, established the Life of Learning Foundation in Merlin, Oregon, in 1993. Both Butler and Finley are authors and teachers continuing with the spiritual principles learned from Howard's work. Tom Russell also studied twelve years with Vernon Howard and founded the nonprofit SuperWisdom Foundation to bring these principles to the internet through free weekly podcasts. An "Archive of Work by Vernon Howard"  has also been made available for viewing online from the estate of one of Vernon Howard’s long time students and New Life Foundation Board member until the time of Vernon’s death, Concetta (Connie) M. Butler.

Bibliography 
Books
Cosmic Command
Psycho-Pictography: The New Way Use the Miracle Power of Your Mind
The Mystic Path to Cosmic Power
Esoteric Mind Power
The Power of Your Supermind
Pathways to Perfect Living
Treasury of Positive Answers
The Mystic Masters Speak
There is a Way Out
1500 Ways to Escape the Human Jungle
Inspire Yourself
Esoteric Encyclopedia of Eternal Knowledge
Solved:The Mystery of Life
Your Power of Natural Knowing
A Treasury of Trueness
700 Inspiring Guides to a New Life
The Power of Esoterics
Secrets of Higher Success
Secrets of Mental Magic, How to Use Your Full Power of Mind
Action power: The miracle way to a successful new life
Your Magic Power To Persuade and Command People
 The Power of Psycho-Pictography: How to Change and Enrich Your Life with the Aid of Creative Visualisation (Vernon Howard, 1973)

Booklets
Be Safe in a Dangerous World
Conquer Anxiety & Frustration
Conquer Harmful Anger 100 Ways
Esoteric Path to a New Life
Expose Human Sharks 100 Ways
Freedom From a Life of Hell
Freedom from Harmful Voices
How To Handle Difficult People
Live Above This Crazy World
Mystery Stories for Winning Happiness
Practical Exercises for Inner Harmony
Sex and Sweethearts
Women — 50 Ways to See Thru Men
Your Power to Say NO
50 Ways to Escape Cruel People
50 Ways to Get Help from God
50 Ways to See Thru People

See also
 American philosophy
 List of American philosophers
 Simple living

Notes 

  García Muñoz, Ernest.(2012) Conciencia y felicidad. El "pragmisticismo" de Vernon Howard. ASIN: B008RMKP12 (Reg.Prop.Int./Spain: Request M-000078/2012) https://www.amazon.es/Conciencia-felicidad-pragmisticismo-Vernon-Howard-ebook/dp/B008RMKP12
 Contemporary Authors   Vol. 108, p. 230. Thomson-Gale, 2003.

External links 

Vernon Howard Official Website
Portrait of Vernon Howard leaning against stacks of his self improvement books, 1965. Los Angeles Times Photographic Archive (Collection 1429). UCLA Library Special Collections, Charles E. Young Research Library, University of California, Los Angeles.

1918 births
1992 deaths
20th-century American non-fiction writers
20th-century Christian mystics
American self-help writers
American spiritual teachers
American spiritual writers
Protestant mystics
People from Haverhill, Massachusetts
Writers from Massachusetts